The Cattle Thief is a 1936 American Western film directed by Spencer Gordon Bennet and starring Ken Maynard, Geneva Mitchell and Ward Bond. It was remade in 1939 as Riders of the Frontier.

Cast

Preservation
A copy of the film is preserved in the Library of Congress collection.

References

Bibliography
 James Robert Parish. Hollywood character actors. Arlington House, 1978.

External links
 

1936 films
1936 Western (genre) films
1930s English-language films
American Western (genre) films
Films directed by Spencer Gordon Bennet
Columbia Pictures films
American black-and-white films
1930s American films